Julius Makoni  was an Anglican bishop in Zimbabwe: he was Bishop of Manicaland from 2009 to 2015.

References

Anglican bishops of Manicaland
21st-century Anglican bishops in Africa
Year of birth missing (living people)
Living people